The municipal flag of Curitiba, in Brazil, is one of the official symbols of the city which, together with its coat of arms and anthem, was officially adopted on 11 May 1967 under Municipal Law No. 2993.

Description
The flag is rectangular, with a width to length ratio of 7:10. A green field is divided into eight parts by tracks of white outlined with red. The city's coat of arms is in the center of the flag, on a white rectangle.

References

Curitiba
Curitiba
Curitiba
1967 establishments in Brazil